Matías Sandoval (born 9 April 1997) is an Argentine professional footballer who plays as a forward for Ituzaingo.

Career
Sandoval's career began with All Boys. He made a total of nineteen appearances across four seasons from the 2015 Primera B Nacional, including for his senior bow on 6 May 2015 in a goalless draw versus Atlético Tucumán. Sandoval scored for the first time during his twentieth match for the club, netting in a 4–0 victory over Agropecuario on 12 November 2017. He left the club in June 2020 after thirty-three appearances. A move to Sportivo Italiano soon followed.

Career statistics
.

References

External links

1997 births
Living people
People from La Matanza Partido
Argentine footballers
Association football forwards
Primera Nacional players
Primera B Metropolitana players
All Boys footballers
Sportivo Italiano footballers
Sportspeople from Buenos Aires Province